Chinauta is a coregiment of the municipality of Fusagasugá in the department of Cundinamarca in Colombia.

Populated places in the Cundinamarca Department